Oread Lake is the oval-shaped 220 m long in southeast–northwest direction and 130 m wide lake on eastern Byers Peninsula, Livingston Island in the South Shetland Islands, Antarctica. It has a surface area of 1.94 ha and drains northwards into Barclay Bay by way of Bedek Stream.

The feature is named after the Oreads, mountain nymphs of Greek mythology.

Location
Detailed Spanish mapping in 1992, and Bulgarian mapping in 2009 and 2017.

Maps
 Península Byers, Isla Livingston. Mapa topográfico a escala 1:25000. Madrid: Servicio Geográfico del Ejército, 1992
 L. Ivanov. Antarctica: Livingston Island and Greenwich, Robert, Snow and Smith Islands. Scale 1:120000 topographic map. Troyan: Manfred Wörner Foundation, 2009. 
 L. Ivanov. Antarctica: Livingston Island and Smith Island. Scale 1:100000 topographic map. Manfred Wörner Foundation, 2017. 
 Antarctic Digital Database (ADD). Scale 1:250000 topographic map of Antarctica. Scientific Committee on Antarctic Research (SCAR). Since 1993, regularly upgraded and updated

See also
 Antarctic lakes
 Livingston Island

Notes

References
 Oread Lake. SCAR Composite Gazetteer of Antarctica
 Bulgarian Antarctic Gazetteer. Antarctic Place-names Commission. (details in Bulgarian, basic data in English)
 Management Plan for Antarctic Specially Protected Area No. 126 Byers Peninsula. Measure 4 (2016), ATCM XXXIX Final Report. Santiago, 2016

External links
 Oread Lake. Adjusted Copernix satellite image

Bodies of water of Livingston Island
Lakes of the South Shetland Islands
Bulgaria and the Antarctic